1234 Elyna , provisional designation , is an Eoan asteroid from the outer regions of the asteroid belt, approximately 25 kilometers in diameter. It was discovered on 18 October 1931, by astronomer Karl Reinmuth at the Heidelberg-Königstuhl State Observatory. The asteroid was named after the flowering plant Elyna (Kobresia; bog sedges).

Orbit and classification 

Elyna is a member the Eos family, the largest asteroid family of the outer main belt consisting of nearly 10,000 asteroids. It orbits the Sun at a distance of 2.8–3.3 AU once every 5 years and 3 months (1,913 days; semi-major axis 3.02 AU). Its orbit has an eccentricity of 0.09 and an inclination of 9° with respect to the ecliptic. The body's observation arc begins at Heidelberg, four days after its official discovery observation.

Physical characteristics 

In the SMASS classification, Elyna is a K-type asteroid, which agrees with the overall spectral type for members of the Eos family.

Rotation period 

Several rotational lightcurves of Elyna were obtained from photometric observations since 1983. Lightcurve analysis gave a rotation period of 5.421 hours with a consolidated brightness amplitude between 0.21 and 0.37 magnitude.

Diameter and albedo 

According to the surveys carried out by the Infrared Astronomical Satellite IRAS, the Japanese Akari satellite and the NEOWISE mission of NASA's Wide-field Infrared Survey Explorer, Elyna measures between 22.876 and 29.08 kilometers in diameter and its surface has an albedo between 0.055 and 0.162.

The Collaborative Asteroid Lightcurve Link derives an albedo of 0.1286 and a diameter of 26.00 kilometers based on an absolute magnitude of 10.77.

Naming 

This minor planet was named after the flowering plant Elyna, a subgenus of the genus Kobresia in the family Cyperaceae, sometimes called bog sedges. The official naming citation was mentioned in The Names of the Minor Planets by Paul Herget in 1955.

Meta-naming 

The initials of the minor planets  through , all discovered by Reinmuth, spell out "G. Stracke". Gustav Stracke was a German astronomer and orbit computer, who had asked that no planet be named after him. In this manner Reinmuth was able to honour the man whilst honoring his wish. Nevertheless, Reinmuth directly honored Stracke by naming planet  later on. The astronomer Brian Marsden was honored by the same type of meta-naming using consecutive initial letters in 1995, spelling out "Brian M." in the sequence of minor planets  through .

Reinmuth's flowers 

Due to his many discoveries, Karl Reinmuth submitted a large list of 66 newly named asteroids in the early 1930s. This list also contained a sequence of 28 asteroids, starting with 1054 Forsytia, that were all named after plants, in particular flowering plants (also see list of minor planets named after animals and plants).

References

External links 
 Asteroid Lightcurve Database (LCDB), query form (info )
 Dictionary of Minor Planet Names, Google books
 Asteroids and comets rotation curves, CdR – Observatoire de Genève, Raoul Behrend
 Discovery Circumstances: Numbered Minor Planets (1)-(5000) – Minor Planet Center
 
 

001234
Discoveries by Karl Wilhelm Reinmuth
Named minor planets
001234
19311018